Alexander Specker (born 30 June 1918) was a Swiss sports shooter. He competed in the 50 m pistol event at the 1952 Summer Olympics.

References

External links
  

1918 births
Possibly living people
Swiss male sport shooters
Olympic shooters of Switzerland
Shooters at the 1952 Summer Olympics
Place of birth missing